The CFU U-20 Tournament  is the Caribbean championship of football for male players under the age of 20 and is organized by the Caribbean Football Union (CFU). It acts as a qualifying tournament for the CONCACAF U-20 Championship.

References

CONCACAF Gold Cup qualification
International association football competitions in the Caribbean